Larice is a genus of snout moths. It was described by Ragonot in 1892, and contains the species L. swinhoei. It is found in India.

References

Pyralinae
Monotypic moth genera
Moths of Asia
Pyralidae genera